Jizabad (also Romanized as Jīzābād) is a village in Bakharz Rural District, in the Central District of Bakharz County, Razavi Khorasan Province, Iran. At the 2016 census, its population was 1193, in 237 families.

References 

Populated places in Bakharz County